In econometrics, the information matrix test is used to determine whether a regression model is misspecified. The test was developed by Halbert White, who observed that in a correctly specified model and under standard regularity assumptions, the Fisher information matrix can be expressed in either of two ways: as the outer product of the gradient, or as a function of the Hessian matrix of the log-likelihood function.

Consider a linear model , where the errors  are assumed to be distributed .

The information matrix can then be expressed as

 
that is the expected value of the outer product of the gradient or score. Second, it can be written as the negative of the Hessian matrix of the log-likelihood function

 

If the model is correctly specified, both expressions should be equal. Combining the equivalent forms yields

 

where  is an  random matrix, where  is the number of parameters. In small samples, however, the test generally performs poorly.

References

Further reading 
 
 

Statistical tests
Regression diagnostics